A.W.O.L. is the fifth studio album by rapper AZ, released on September 6, 2005. It was recorded after Final Call, which AZ declined to release because his label had pushed its release back two months—according to him, they were also the source of its early leak to the press and the internet. Garnering critical praise with production from highly regarded New York underground acts such as DJ Premier, Buckwild, and DipSet production duo the Heatmakerz, the rapper abandoned his previously money-oriented subject matter, stating that he "wanted it to be all street. A.W.O.L. is the first album AZ released on his own Quiet Money Records imprint. A.W.O.L. 1.5 was released several months later, which included a bonus disc featuring a cappella and instrumental versions to the songs on A.W.O.L..

Track listing

Sample credits

Street Life
"Half Moon Serenade" by Naoko Kawai
Bedtime Story
"Tell Me a Bedtime Story" by Quincy Jones
The Come Up
"Holdin' On" by Lawrence Hilton-Jacobs
"Creepin on ah Come Up" by Bone Thugs-n-Harmony
A.W.O.L.
"Wildflower" by The New Birth
Magic Hour
"He Keeps Something Groovy Goin' On" by Gwen McCrae

Album singles

Charts

References

External links
 A.W.O.L. at Discogs

2005 albums
AZ (rapper) albums
Albums produced by Disco D
Albums produced by DJ Premier
Albums produced by Buckwild
Albums produced by Tha Bizness
Albums produced by Emile Haynie
Albums produced by Tone Mason